Ellis Robins School is a Zimbabwean boys' high school that was founded in Salisbury, Rhodesia in 1953. It is located in the suburb of Mabelreign in Salisbury (now called Harare). Next door is Mabelreign Girls High School, the school's sister school. The Ellis Robins school colours are blue and gold, the badge has two dolphins facing each other, and the school Latin motto is "Esse Quam Videri" which means "To be, rather than to seem".

This motto comes from the family coat of arms of Sir Ellis Robins, who was Chairman of the British South Africa Company and the school is also named after him.

There was a government proposal in 2003 to rename all schools in Zimbabwe and Ellis Robins was scheduled to be called Leopold Takawira Boys High but overwhelming parental disapproval ensures that the original name is still used.

The school is one of the popular group A schools that participate in the Dairiboard Schools Rugby Festival which is held annually at Prince Edward School. Ellis Robins who are famously known as "FUSH", are fierce rivals with Allan Wilson High School with whom they compete with in various sporting disciplines. This rivalry is known to have existed since the colonial era.

House system
Malcolm (boarders), Lawley, Newton, Abercorn

Clubs and societies 
The school has a variety of Clubs and Societies that are offered to the students to participate in. Many of these run throughout the academic year on all 3 terms.

Drama
Toastmasters
Leo Club
Debate
Public Speaking
Scripture Union
Quiz & Current Affairs
Zimbabwe United Nations Association (ZUNA)
Conservation
Shona Culture

Sports
Sports at the school include Soccer, Rugby, Field Hockey, Table Tennis, Lawn Tennis, Chess, Cricket, Volleyball, Badminton, Basketball, Cross Country and Gymnastics.

Old boys association (EROS)
The Old Boys Association (EROS) is an association for the alumni that attended Ellis Robins School. The purpose is to maintain school traditions and reunite the Old Boys. Former students are able to contribute to their alma mater through the Old Boys Association which keeps a close working relationship with the school.

Notable alumni
Heidi Holland – Author and journalist
 Perez Livias (graduated 2016 ) Environmentalist 
Grant Symmonds – First Class Cricketer
John Linwood – ex-BBC Chief Technology Officer
Abel Chimukoko – Zimbabwe long distance runner
Carlprit – Rapper
Roy Bennett (politician) (19572018), Zimbabwean politician
Kevin Duers
Pastor G – Gospel artist
 Winston Chitando (graduated 1981), Zimbabwe Minister of Mines, 20172019
 Bronson Gengezha (born 1981), sculptor
 Albert Alan Owen – composer
 Youngson Mtk – Rapper

References

External links
Official Website
Alumni graduates page
Ellis Robins School Association page 

Educational institutions established in 1953
Day schools in Zimbabwe
Boarding schools in Zimbabwe
Boys' schools in Zimbabwe
Boys' high schools in Zimbabwe
1953 establishments in Southern Rhodesia